Werner Loewe (18 May 1941 – 2022) was a German politician. A member of the Social Democratic Party of Germany, he served in the Hamburg Parliament from 1978 to 1986.

Loewe died in Hamburg in 2022, at the age of 81.

References

1941 births
2022 deaths
20th-century German politicians
Members of the Hamburg Parliament
Social Democratic Party of Germany politicians
People from the Province of Pomerania
People from Szczecin